Langarika is a town located in the municipality of Iruraiz-Gauna, in the province of Álava (Araba), in the autonomous community of Basque Country, northern Spain.

External links
 LANGARIKA in the Bernardo Estornés Lasa - Auñamendi Encyclopedia (Euskomedia Fundazioa) 

Towns in Álava